York is an unincorporated community in Atchison County, in the U.S. state of Missouri.

History
York was founded in 1857 by Archibald York, and named for him. A post office called York was established in 1878, and remained in operation until 1901.

References

Unincorporated communities in Atchison County, Missouri
1857 establishments in Missouri
Unincorporated communities in Missouri